Holly Golightly (born Holly Golightly Smith on 7 September 1966) is a British singer-songwriter. Her mother christened her after the main character of Truman Capote's Breakfast at Tiffany's. Her musical style ranges from garage rock to R&B.

Musical career
While she was dating Thee Headcoats' drummer Bruce Brand she had an impromptu singing performance with his band. Billy Childish, founder of the Headcoats, added her to the line up of The Delmonas and changed the name to Thee Headcoatees. Thee Headcoatees were primarily a garage band that backed up the Thee Headcoats. In 1995 she started her solo career but continued to be an active member of Thee Headcoatees until they disbanded in 1999. For her solo career, she draws from rhythm and blues, rockabilly, and sounds of the 1960s or earlier. She has released 13 albums of her own and has collaborated with other musicians, such as Billy Childish, Rocket from the Crypt and The White Stripes. She performed two songs on the soundtrack of the film Broken Flowers: "There Is an End (featuring Holly Golightly)" by The Greenhornes & Holly Golightly (which can also be found on the Greenhornes' album Dual Mono), and "Tell Me Now So I Know" by Holly Golightly (found on the album Truly She Is None Other), which is a song originally written by Ray Davies.

She is a collector of rare old songs which she often covers.

2000s

Golightly formed a duo in the mid-2000s, recording and touring extensively with her longtime bandmate Lawyer Dave. As Holly Golightly and The Brokeoffs, they released five albums and one EP between 2007 and 2012.  Their first album, You Can't Buy A Gun When You're Crying, is a reference to comedian Lord Carrett's joke "I learned a lot from my second marriage... I learned they won't sell you a handgun if you're crying..." Holly Golightly & The Brokeoffs were winners of the ninth annual Independent Music Awards for the best Americana album, Dirt Don't Hurt. In 2003, she sang with The White Stripes on the track "It's True That We Love One Another" on their fourth album, Elephant. Time Out New York described her as an "English garage rock doyenne." In 2012, they released Sunday Run Me Over, their first album recorded entirely at their home in rural Georgia.

Discography

LPs
The Good Things (1995, Damaged Goods)
The Main Attraction (1996, Damaged Goods)
Laugh It Up (1996, Vinyl Japan)
Painted On (1997, Sympathy for the Record Industry)
Serial Girlfriend (1998, Damaged Goods)
In Blood (1999, with Billy Childish, Damaged Goods)
God Don't Like It (2000, Damaged Goods)
Live in America (2000, Majestic Twelve Records)
Desperate Little Town (2001, with Dan Melchior, Sympathy for the Record Industry)
Truly She Is None Other (2003)
Slowly but Surely (2004, Damaged Goods)
Slowtown Now! (2015, Damaged Goods)
Do The Get Along (2018, Damaged Goods)

Holly Golightly & the Brokeoffs
You Can't Buy a Gun When You're Crying (2007)
Nobody Will Be There (2007)
Dirt Don't Hurt (2008)
Medicine County (2010, Transdreamer Records)
No Help Coming (2011, Transdreamer Records)
Long Distance (2012, Damaged Goods)
Sunday Run Me Over (2012, Transdreamer Records)
All Her Fault (2014, Transdreamer Records)
Coulda Shoulda Woulda (2015, Transdreamer Records)
Clippety Clop (2018, Transdreamer Records)

Lives and compilations
Up the Empire (1998, Live, Sympathy for the Record Industry)
Live in America (2000)
Singles Round-Up (2000, compilation, Damaged Goods)
Down Gina's at 3 (2004, live)
Live at Maxwell's 24 November 2004 (2004, live)
My First Holly Golightly Album (2005, compilation with eight new songs)
Down The Line (2006, compilation, Damaged Goods)
nobody will be there (Holly Golightly & The Brokeoffs, 2011, live, Damaged Goods)

Singles, EPs
Jiggy Jiggy with Holly Golightly EP (1994), Vinyl Japan
"Virtually Happy" (1995), Damaged Goods
Mary-Ann EP (1996), Vinyl Japan
"No Big Thing" (1996), Hangman's Daughter
"Girl in the Shower" (1996), Super Electro
"Pinky Please Come Back" (1996), Super Electro
"Come the Day" (1996), Damaged Goods
"Believe Me" (1997), Sympathy for the Record Industry
"Listen/Rain Down Rain" (1999), KRS
"Walk a Mile" (2003), Damaged Goods
"On the Fire" (2005), Damaged Goods
"Christmas Tree on Fire" (2006), Damaged Goods
"My 45" (2008), Damaged Goods (Holly Golightly & the Brokeoffs)
"Devil Do" EP (2009), Transdreamer Records (Holly Golightly & the Brokeoffs)
"Seven Wonders" (2015), Damaged Goods

References

External links
 
 Record Label
  Holly Golightly Interview (in Greek) by mixtape.gr
 November 2008 Interview with L.A. Record

1966 births
Living people
English women guitarists
English guitarists
English women singer-songwriters
Garage punk musicians
Sympathy for the Record Industry artists
British indie rock musicians
English punk rock singers
Independent Music Awards winners
Singers from London
Women punk rock singers